David Rush may refer to:

David Rush (footballer) (born 1971), English footballer
David Rush (rapper) (born 1983), American rapper